Wong Peng Soon,   (17 February 1917 – 22 May 1996) was a Malayan/Singaporean badminton player who reigned as a top player in Malaya from the 1930s to the 1950s when it was a single nation. Noted for his smooth but powerful strokes and graceful footwork, he won the singles title seven times in Singapore and eight times in Malaya during this period, as well as being the top player in the All England, the Danish Open, the Indian and Philippines championships to name a few. 

Acknowledged as one of the greatest badminton players of all time, he won the All England singles title four times in only five attempts and dominated the Thomas Cup in the late 1940s to the mid 1950s as a member of the Malayan teams. Wong's great rival during his career was his contemporary Ong Poh Lim.

Early life
Wong was born into a large and wealthy family in Johor Bahru, Malaya. He was the seventh son of Mr Wong Ah Yam and Madam Mak Qui Tong. His granduncle is Wong Ah Fook, who was a good friend of Sultan Abu Bakar and was the contractor responsible for the construction of Istana Besar. Wong has nine brothers and seven sisters. Of his siblings, five brothers and one sister were also prominent Johore badminton players. The family stayed in a mansion at Jalan Ah Siang, Johor Bahru.

Badminton career
Having grown up in a family with a love for badminton, Wong started playing the sport since young. His career began when he joined Mayflower Badminton Party in Singapore as a teenager, and went on to win numerous club and interstate competitions. He excelled in the singles event and quickly rose to become a household name in Singapore and Malaya.

In 1938, Wong won his first Singapore Open singles title and went on to win the tournament six more times in 1939, 1941, 1947, 1948, 1949 and 1951.

Wong also captured his first two Malaysia Open singles titles in 1940 and 1941 before a break due to World War II prevented him from continuing his career until 1947 when he once again won the crown. He then won five titles in a row from 1949 to 1953, until his run was stopped by Ong Poh Lim in 1954. His eight Malaysian singles titles were also a long-standing international circuit record jointly held by the legendary Rudy Hartono (eight-time All England champion) and Morten Frost (eight-time Denmark Open champion) till it was broken by Lee Chong Wei of Malaysia in 2013.

In 1950, he became the first Asian to win the All-England Championships, and won the title again in 1951, 1952, and 1955, earning him an international reputation as the "Great Wong". He was also a member of the victorious Malayan Thomas Cup teams of 1949, 1952, and 1955, serving as captain of the last. His achievements in 1955 were remarkable because he was 38 years old at the time, an age by which most badminton players were considered past their prime.

Wong also won the Denmark Open men's singles title in 1951, the Bombay Open men's singles and men's doubles titles with Abdullah Piruz in 1951 and the Philippines Open men's singles and men's doubles titles with Cheong Hock Leng in 1952.

Wong retired from competitive badminton after the 1955 Thomas Cup. He became a badminton coach for the Singapore Youth Sports Centre. He also coached the Malayan team in its bid to retain the Thomas Cup in 1958, when Malaya lost the title to Indonesia. Wong later took up coaching stints in Thailand, Canada, India and Japan, as well as at the Haarlem Badminton Club of Holland in 1966.

Professionalism
Wong was an advocate of strong work ethic, physical fitness, and mental preparation. He will cycle from Johor to Singapore just for training even though it was many kilometers away. He was a disciplinarian who adhered to a routine of rigorous training that included sessions of skipping lasting more than an hour. Wong always studied his opponents before playing against them. He was renowned for maintaining a strict diet and he never stayed out late in the evening. He was also known for his meticulous care of his equipment, often going to the extent of personally stringing and fixing his own rackets.

Personal life 
Wong married Doreen Poi Chim Neo at a church in Seremban on 3 August 1947 and moved to Singapore shortly after. They lived at a single-storey home in Jalan Jarak, Seletar Hills and had two daughters and a son.

Wong suffered a stroke in 1981 which left him partially paralysed. Although he regained mobility, his health slowly declined thereafter.

Death
Wong died on 22 May 1996 at Toa Payoh Hospital, Singapore, at the age of 79, due to pneumonia. His wake was attended by the officials from Singapore Badminton Association (SBA) as well as then Minister for Community Development, Abdullah Tarmugi. A one-hour Mass was also held at the Church of St Vincent de Paul where Wong had worshipped. More than 150 relatives and friends gathered to bid a final farewell to Wong at the Mount Vernon Crematorium where he was cremated.

Awards
In the 1956 New Year Honours, Wong's contribution to the sport was recognised when he was made a Member of the Order of the British Empire (MBE) "for services to sport in the Federation of Malaya". In 1962, he made local history as the first and still the only sportsperson to date to be awarded the Sijil Kemuliaan (Certificate of Honour) by the Government of Singapore. 

In 1985, the International Badminton Federation (IBF) awarded Wong the Distinguished Services Award for his services to the sport. In 1986, Wong was inducted into the Singapore Sports Council (SSC) Sports Museum Hall of Fame. 

Three years after his death, the International Badminton Federation (IBF) inducted him into its Hall of Fame posthumously in May 1999. Then chairman of the IBF, H R Ward, commented, that "Wong was one of the most remarkable players" and "had enhanced the sport through exceptional achievements". In a Straits Times poll of 2000, Wong was voted as Singapore's "Sports Personality of the Century". The Olympic Council of Malaysia inducted Wong into its Hall of Fame in 2004.

Achievements

References

External links

1917 births
1996 deaths
Singaporean people of Cantonese descent
Singaporean sportspeople of Chinese descent
Malaysian people of Cantonese descent
Malaysian sportspeople of Chinese descent
Malaysian male badminton players
Members of the Order of the British Empire
Singaporean male badminton players
Recipients of the Sijil Kemuliaan